Edward 'Junior' Gyamfi (born 11th April 2004) is a professional footballer who plays as a midfielder for  club Milton Keynes Dons.

Club career

Milton Keynes Dons
Born in Milton Keynes, Gyamfi joined the academy of local EFL League One club Milton Keynes Dons in 2021, and later signed professional terms in August 2022. He made his professional debut on 30 August 2022 in a 2–1 EFL Trophy group stage defeat at home to Cheltenham Town.

Career statistics

References

External links

Living people
German footballers
Association football midfielders
English Football League players
Milton Keynes Dons F.C. players
2004 births